William Philip Sidney, 1st Viscount De L'Isle,  (23 May 1909 – 5 April 1991), known as Lord De L'Isle and Dudley between 1945 and 1956, was a British Army officer, politician and Victoria Cross recipient who served as the 15th Governor-General of Australia, in office from 1961 to 1965. He was the last non-Australian to hold the position.

Sidney was born into an aristocratic family and attended Eton College before going on to Magdalene College, Cambridge. He became a chartered accountant, but also joined the Territorial Army. During the Second World War, Sidney served with the Grenadier Guards in France and Italy; he was awarded the Victoria Cross in 1944 for his actions in the Battle of Anzio. He was elected to the House of Commons later that year, as a member of the Conservative Party.

In 1945, Sidney succeeded his father as Baron De L'Isle and Dudley, consequently being elevated to the House of Lords. He served as Secretary of State for Air from 1951 to 1955, under Winston Churchill, and was raised to the viscountcy in 1956. Lord De L'Isle became governor-general in 1961 on the recommendation of Robert Menzies, the Prime Minister of Australia. He served for just under four years with little controversy; as well as being the last British governor-general of Australia, he was also the last to wear the traditional vice-regal uniform.

Early life
Sidney was the younger of two children, and the only son, of William Sidney, 5th Baron De L'Isle and Dudley (19 August 1859 – 18 June 1945) and his wife, Winifred Agneta Yorke Bevan (d. 11 February 1959). He was a descendant of William IV by his mistress Dorothea Jordan. He was educated at Eton College and Magdalene College, Cambridge and became a chartered accountant. In 1929 he joined the Grenadier Guards Reserve of Officers.

Marriage and issue
Lord De L'Isle married Hon Jacqueline Corrine Yvonne Vereker (20 October 1914 – 15 November 1962), daughter of Field Marshal John Vereker, 6th Viscount Gort, on 8 June 1940. The couple had five children:

 Hon. Elizabeth Sophia (born 12 March 1941, died 3 February 2016), married 5 times, to George Silver Oliver Annesley Colthurst, to Sir Edward Humphry Tyrrell Wakefield, 2nd Bt., to Captain James Silvester Rattray of Craighall-Rattray, 28th of Rattray, to Andrew H. Lane Paneyko, and to Robert Samuel Clive Abel Smith.
 Hon. Catherine Mary (born 20 October 1942), married to Martin John Wilbraham, and then to Nicholas Hyde Villiers.
 Philip John Algernon, 2nd Viscount De L'Isle (born 21 April 1945)
 Hon. Anne Marjorie (born 15 August 1947), married to Lt.-Cdr. David Alexander Harries.
 Hon. Lucy Corinna Agneta (born 21 February 1953), married to Michael Willoughby, 13th Baron Middleton

After his wife's death, he married the widowed Lady Glanusk (née Margaret Shoubridge) on 24 March 1966 in Paris. They had no children.

War service
During the Second World War, Sidney fought in the Battle of France and the Italian Campaign. While serving as a company commander in the 5th Battalion, Grenadier Guards (itself part of 24th Guards Brigade of the 1st Infantry Division), he led a handful of men in the defence of the Anzio beachhead in February 1944, for which he was awarded the Victoria Cross. Sidney led a successful attack which drove German troops of the 147th Grenadier Regiment out of a gully. Later he led another counter-attack and dashed forward, engaging the Germans with his tommy gun at point-blank range, forcing a withdrawal. When the attack was renewed, Sidney and one guardsman were wounded and another killed, but he would not consent to have his wounds dressed until the Germans had been beaten off and the battalion's position had been consolidated. During this time, although extremely weak from loss of blood, he continued to encourage and inspire his men.

In later life, when asked where he had been shot, he would jocularly respond that he was shot in Italy. This was to conceal that he had been shot in the buttocks. The ribbon for the medal was made from one of his father-in-law Lord Gort's uniforms and was awarded by General Sir Harold Alexander, commanding the Allied Armies in Italy, on 3 March 1944 in Italy.

Political life
At a by-election in October 1944, he was elected unopposed to the House of Commons as Conservative Member of Parliament (MP) for Chelsea. His father died in June 1945 and he succeeded as 6th Baron De L'Isle and Dudley, requiring translation to the House of Lords. He thus retired from the House of Commons prior to the July 1945 general election.

In 1951 he was appointed Secretary of State for Air under Winston Churchill and held that office until 1955. During this time he visited Australia, travelling to Woomera to examine weapons research and meeting the Prime Minister, Robert Menzies. In 1956 he was created Viscount De L'Isle, of Penshurst in the County of Kent.

Governor-General
Following the death in office of Lord Dunrossil in February 1961, Prime Minister Robert Menzies recommended De L'Isle as his military honours, aristocratic background, and political experience apparently made him, according to one author, Menzies' "vision of ideal governor-general material". De L'Isle was sworn in on 3 August 1961. He continued Dunrossil's revival of the full ceremonial vice-regal uniform, but would be the last governor-general to do so. De L'Isle faced no constitutional issues during his time in office; the Official Secretary throughout his term was Murray Tyrrell.

De L'Isle was the first governor-general since William McKell (1947–1953) to have children living at Yarralumla, and this made him popular with the general public. However, his wife fell ill in his first year of office, and died on 16 November 1962, aged 48. Despite this, he chose to continue in office until the expiry of Dunrossil's original five-year term in 1965. Two of his daughters, Catherine and Anne, acted as the official hostesses in place of their mother.

Retirement and death
By the time of his retirement in 1965, public opinion was strongly in favour of an Australian Governor-General, although this was not a reflection on his performance in the role. His continuing interest in Australia was shown by several visits after his retirement, the last for Australia's bicentenary in 1988 when he presented a bronze statue, which now stands in the grounds of Government House in Canberra.

In 1975 he co-founded what is now called The Freedom Association, a free-market campaign group opposed to the post-war consensus that played a prominent role in the Grunwick Dispute.

Viscount De L'Isle died in Kent on 5 April 1991 and was buried in the Sidney family vault at St John the Baptist, Penshurst. He was the last surviving Victoria Cross recipient who had been a member of both Houses of Parliament. He was succeeded in his titles by his only son, Philip.

Styles and honours

 The Honourable William Sidney (1909–30 March 1944)
 The Honourable William Sidney VC (30 March 1944 – 11 October 1944)
The Honourable  William Sidney VC MP 11 October 1944 – 18 June 1945)
 The Right Honourable The Lord De L'Isle and Dudley VC (18 June 1945 – 1951)
The Right Honourable The Lord De L'Isle and Dudley VC PC (1951–13 January 1956)
The Right Honourable The Viscount De L'Isle VC PC (13 January 1956 – 11 May 1961)
The Right Honourable The Viscount De L'Isle VC GCMG PC (11 May 1961 – 14 March 1963)
The Right Honourable The Viscount De L'Isle VC GCMG GCVO PC (14 March 1963 – 23 April 1968)
The Right Honourable The Viscount De L'Isle VC KG GCMG GCVO PC (23 April 1968 – 5 April 1991)

In 1965 De L'Isle succeeded his kinsman as ninth Baronet of Castle Goring.

He was appointed a Knight Companion of the Order of the Garter (KG) on 23 April 1968, becoming one of only two men ever to have held both the highest orders of gallantry and chivalry – the Victoria Cross and the Order of the Garter (the other being Field Marshal the Lord Roberts).

See also

 List of United Kingdom MPs with the shortest service

Notes

References

External links

Location of grave and VC medal

1909 births
1991 deaths
Governors-General of Australia
British Secretaries of State
Secretaries of State for Air (UK)
British World War II recipients of the Victoria Cross
Viscounts De L'Isle
Eldest sons of British hereditary barons
Sidney, William
Sidney, William
UK MPs who inherited peerages
UK MPs who were granted peerages
Members of the Privy Council of the United Kingdom
Knights of the Garter
Knights Grand Cross of the Order of St Michael and St George
Knights Grand Cross of the Royal Victorian Order
Grenadier Guards officers
British Army personnel of World War II
Alumni of Magdalene College, Cambridge
People from Chelsea, London
British Army recipients of the Victoria Cross
Members of the Freedom Association
Ministers in the Churchill caretaker government, 1945
Ministers in the third Churchill government, 1951–1955
Ministers in the Eden government, 1955–1957
Shelley baronets, of Castle Goring
Barons De L'Isle and Dudley
Viscounts created by Elizabeth II
Military personnel from London
Burials in Kent
People educated at Eton College